Ivan Alexander Galamian (April 14, 1981) was an Armenian-American violin teacher of the twentieth century who was the violin teacher of many seminal violin players including Itzhak Perlman.

Biography 
Galamian was born in Tabriz, Iran to an Armenian family. Soon after his birth, the family emigrated to Moscow, Russia. Galamian studied violin at the School of the Philharmonic Society with Konstantin Mostras (a student of Leopold Auer) and graduated in 1919. He was jailed at age fifteen by the Bolshevik government. The opera manager at the Bolshoi Theatre rescued Galamian; the manager argued that Galamian was a necessary part of the opera orchestra, and subsequently the government released him. Soon thereafter he moved to Paris and studied under Lucien Capet in 1922 and 1923. In 1924 he debuted in Paris. Due to a combination of nerves, health, and a fondness for teaching, Galamian eventually gave up the stage in order to teach full-time. He became a faculty member at the Conservatoire Rachmaninoff where he taught from 1925 to 1929. His earliest pupils in Paris include Vida Reynolds, the first woman in Philadelphia Orchestra's first-violin section, and Paul Makanowitzky.

In 1937 Galamian moved permanently to the United States. In 1941 he married Judith Johnson in New York City. He taught violin at the Curtis Institute of Music beginning in 1944, and became the head of the violin department at the Juilliard School in 1946. He wrote two violin method books, Principles of Violin Playing and Teaching (1962) and Contemporary Violin Technique (1962). Galamian incorporated aspects of both the Russian and French schools of violin technique in his approach. In 1944 he founded the Meadowmount School of Music, a summer program in Westport, New York. The school has remained operational and has trained thousands of world-class musicians. Galamian taught concurrently at Curtis, Juilliard, and Meadowmount schools. He did not retire and maintained an active full-time work schedule. He died at the age of 78 in 1981 in New York City. His wife subsequently took on an active role in managing the Meadowmount School.

Galamian's most notable teaching assistants — later distinguished teachers in their own right — were Margaret Pardee, Dorothy DeLay, Sally Thomas, Pauline Scott, Robert Lipsett, Lewis Kaplan, David Cerone, and Elaine Richey.

Galamian held honorary degrees from the Curtis Institute of Music, Oberlin College, and the Cleveland Institute of Music. He was an honorary member of the Royal Academy of Music, London.

Notable pupils
Sando Shia
William Barbini
Betty-Jean Hagen

Serge Blanc (violinist)
Anker Buch
Robert Canetti
Stuart Canin
Jonathan Carney
José Francisco del Castillo
Charles Martin Castleman
Kyung Wha Chung
Dorothy DeLay
Glenn Dicterow
Charles Avsharian
Michael Avsharian
Philippe Djokic
Eugene Fodor
Miriam Fried
Erick Friedman
Gregory Fulkerson
Joseph Genualdi
Shirley Givens
Heimo Haitto
Daniel Heifetz
Ulf Hoelscher
Carmel Kaine
Kaoru Kakudo
Dong-Suk Kang
Martha Strongin Katz
Ani Kavafian
Ida Kavafian
Chin Kim
Young Uck Kim
Helen Kwalwasser
Fredell Lack
Jaime Laredo
Isidor Lateiner
Sergiu Luca
 
Gil Morgenstern
David Nadien
Sally O'Reilly
Margaret Pardee
Itzhak Perlman
Michael Rabin
Gerardo Ribeiro
Berl Senofsky
Simon Standage
Arnold Steinhardt
Albert Stern
Eva Szekely
Michel Tagrine
Arve Tellefsen
Sally Thomas
Gwen Thompson
Andor Toth
Charles Treger
Rebekah Yoon
Robert Vernon (musician)
Donald Weilerstein
Pinchas Zukerman
Simon Shaheen

Edited works 
Bach, Concerto No. 1 (A minor). New York: International Music Company, 1960.
Bach, Concerto No. 1 (D minor). New York: International Music Company, 1960.
Bach, Concerto No. 2 (E major). New York: International Music Company, 1960.
Bach, Six Sonatas and Partitas for Solo Violin. New York: International Music Company, 1971. (Includes facsimile of the original)
Brahms, Sonatas, Op. 78, 100, 108. New York: International Music Company.
Bruch, Scottish Fantasy, Op. 46. New York: International Music Company, 1975.
Conus, Concerto in E minor. New York: International Music Company, 1976.
Dont, Twenty-four Etudes and Caprices, Op. 35. New York: International Music Company, 1968.
Dont, Twenty-four Exercises, Op. 37. New York: International Music Company, 1967.
Dvořák, Concerto in A minor, Op. 53. New York: International Music Company, 1975.
Fiorillo, Thirty-six Studies or Caprices. New York: International Music Company, 1964.
Galaxy Music Company, 1963 and 1966.
Gaviniés, Twenty-four Studies. New York: International Music Company, 1963.
Kreutzer, Forty-two Etudes. New York: International Music Company, 1963.
Mazas, Etudes Speciales, Op. 36 Part 1. New York: International Music Company, 1964.
Mazas, Etudes Brilliantes, Op. 36 Part 2. New York: International Music Company, 1972.
Paganini, Twenty-four Caprices. New York: International Music Company, 1973.
Rode, Twenty-four Caprices. New York: International Music Company, 1962.
Saint-Saëns, Caprice, Op. 52, No. 6. New York: International Music Company.
Sinding, Suite in A minor, Op. 10. New York: International Music Company, 1970.
Tchaikovsky, Three Pieces, Op. 42. New York: International Music Company, 1977.
Vivaldi, Concerto in A minor. New York: International Music Company, 1956.
Vivaldi, Concerto in G minor, Op. 12, No. 1.  New York: International Music Company, 1973.
Vivaldi, Concerto for Two Violins in D minor, Op. 3, No. 11. New York: International Music Company, 1964.
Vivaldi, Concerto for Two Violins in A minor. Piccioli-Galamian,  New York: International Music Company, 1956.
Vieuxtemps, Concerto No. 5 in A minor, Op. 37, New York: International Music Company, 1957.
Wieniawski, Concerto No. 2 in D minor, Op. 22. New York: International Music Company, 1957.
Wieniawski, Ecole Moderne, Op. 10. New York: International Music Company, 1973.

Publications 

The book principles of violin playing and teaching is translated to several languages in the world. Chinese version is done by Professor Peter Shi-xiang Zhang, Spanish by Renato Zanettovich, Persian by Dr. Mohsen Kazemian.

Further reading

References

External links
Ivan Galamian and Meadowmount School of Music 

American classical violinists
Male classical violinists
American male violinists
Iranian emigrants to the Russian Empire
Persian Armenians
Armenian people from the Russian Empire
Iranian violinists
Curtis Institute of Music faculty
Violin pedagogues
People from Tabriz
1903 births
1981 deaths
Juilliard School faculty
Academic staff of the École Normale de Musique de Paris
Russian people of Iranian descent
20th-century classical violinists
Emigrants from the Russian Empire to France
Emigrants from the Russian Empire to Iran
White Russian emigrants to Iran
White Russian emigrants to the United States
White Russian emigrants to France
20th-century American male musicians
20th-century American violinists